Tin Hau Temple Road is a road starting in Causeway Bay near Tin Hau MTR station with a large portion being in the North Point Mid-Levels on Hong Kong Island, in Hong Kong.

Starting from King's Road on the west, the road then slopes up, before being mostly flat, until it ends in a dead end after a roundabout. A number of intersections connect Tin Hau Temple Road to other roads, such as Fortress Hill Road, Cloud View Road and Pak Fuk Road.

See also

 Tin Hau Temple, Causeway Bay

Eastern District, Hong Kong
Roads on Hong Kong Island
Odonyms referring to a building
Odonyms referring to religion
North Point